A pump is a mechanical device used to move fluids or slurries.

Pump may also refer to:

Arts, entertainment, and media

Music
 Pump, two different Caribbean drums, one each used in the music of Barbados and St Maarten
 "Pump Up the Jam", track by Belgian act Technotronic (1989)
 Pump (album), Aerosmith album (1989)
 Lil Pump, American rapper and songwriter
 "The Pump", song by Quiet Riot from the QR III album
 "Pump It Up!", track by Belgian musician Danzel (2004)

Other uses in arts, entertainment and media
 Pump (film), documentary film on petroleum-based fuel consumption (2014)
 Pump It Up, video game series

Footwear
 Ballet pump or ballet flat, flat-soled ballet shoe
 Court shoe, or pump, heeled slip-on shoe with a low-cut front
 Ghillies (dance), or pumps, soft, laced shoes worn by Scottish and Irish dancers
 Plimsoll shoe or pump, athletic shoe style
 Reebok Pump, athletic shoe line

Science and technology
 Pump (constellation) or Antlia
 Breast pump, mechanical device that lactating women use to extract milk from their breasts
 Heat pump, device that transfers heat energy from a source of heat to a heat sink
 Ion pump (biology), or ion transporter, transmembrane protein that moves ions across a biological membrane against their concentration gradient through active transport
 Ion pump (physics), or sputter ion pump, type of vacuum pump which operates by sputtering a metal getter
 Laser pumping, the act of energy transfer from an external source into the gain medium of a laser
 Skeletal-muscle pump, collection of skeletal muscles that aid the heart in the circulation of blood
 Vacuum pump, device that removes gas molecules from a sealed volume in order to leave behind a partial vacuum
 Muscle pump, term used in fitness describing a phenomenon after intense resistance training

Other uses
 Pump (skateboarding), technique in skateboarding
 Pump (water), brand of bottled spring water available in Australia and New Zealand
 Project Waterpump (alternatively Operation Waterpump, or simply Waterpump), a classified military operation of the Laotian Civil War

See also
 Pumping (disambiguation)